Tahin Tahera (born 28 June 1990) is a Bangladeshi former cricketer who played as a left-handed batter and slow left-arm orthodox bowler. She played for Bangladesh in 2011, before the side was granted full international status. She played domestic cricket for Khulna Division and Rangpur Division.

Early life and background
Tahera was born on 28 June 1990 in Khulna, Bangladesh.

References

External links
 
 

1990 births
Living people
People from Khulna
Bangladeshi women cricketers
Khulna Division women cricketers
Rangpur Division women cricketers